Zainab Shamsuna Ahmed  (born 16 June 1960) is a Nigerian accountant who has been serving as Minister of Finance, Budget and National Planning since 2019. At the time, President Muhammadu Buhari brought the two ministries under her as one, making her the de facto Minister of Economy.

An accountant by profession with a Bachelor of Science degree in accounting from ABU Zaria and a Master's in Business Administration (MBA), Ahmed was appointed as Finance Minister upon the resignation of the previous Minister of Finance Kemi Adeosun on 14 September 2018. In 2015, she was appointed as the Minister of State for Budget and National Planning by President Buhari.

Early life and education 
Ahmed was born in Kaduna State. She had her secondary school education at Queen Amina College, Kaduna, and later proceeded to have her A'Level in Zaria. She got her first degree in Accounting from Ahmadu Bello University in 1981, after-which she proceeded to Olabisi Onabanjo University for her MBA.

Ahmed's MBA was obtained in August 2004 from the Ogun State University, Ago Iwoye; while her BSc Accounting (1981) was from Ahmadu Bello University (ABU), Zaria; IJMB ‘A’ Levels (1979) from SBS/ABU Zaria; and WASC ‘O’ Level in 1977 from Queen Amina College, Kaduna.

Political career 
 Ahmed is the current Minister of Finance, Budget and National Planning of the Federal Republic of Nigeria. A portfolio that makes her one of the country's  most influential minister. In that capacity, she's seeking to boost government revenue, with plans underway to raise value-added tax while taming public debt that is now estimated at more than $80billion.

Ahmed was the immediate past executive secretary and national coordinator of the Nigeria Extractive Industries Transparency Initiative (NEITI). She was also a member of the last two NEITI boards, having worked in the NEITI and global EITI.

Upon graduation, Ahmed was employed in 1982 as an Accountant II in the Main Accounts of Ministry of Finance in Kaduna State and was promoted to Accountant I in March 1984, but resigned in 1985 to join NITEL. Earlier, she had done her National Youth Service in Kaduna State in 1981/1982 where she was posted for primary assignment to Messrs. Egunjobi Suleiman & Co. Chartered Accountants, and served as an Audit Trainee.

Ahmed has served the Nigerian public in various high ranking positions, including as managing director of the Kaduna State of Nigeria's investment company, and also the Chief Finance Officer of the Nigeria mobile telecommunications company. Zainab was reappointed and sworn in as the Minister of Finance on 21 August 2019 by the President

Other activities
 African Development Bank (AfDB), Ex-Officio Member of the Board of Governors (since 2018)
 ECOWAS Bank for Investment and Development (EBID), Ex-Officio Member of the Board of Governors (since 2018)
 International Monetary Fund (IMF), Ex-Officio Member of the Board of Governors (since 2018)
 Islamic Development Bank, Ex-Officio Member of the Board of Governors (since 2018)
 World Bank, Ex-Officio Member of the Board of Governors (since 2018)

Award
In October 2022, a Nigerian national honour of Commander of the Order of the Niger (CON) was conferred on her by President Muhammadu Buhari.

See also
Cabinet of Nigeria
Finance Minister of Nigeria

References

Federal ministers of Nigeria
People from Kaduna State
Olabisi Onabanjo University alumni
Ahmadu Bello University alumni
Living people
Politicians from Kaduna State
21st-century Nigerian women politicians
21st-century Nigerian politicians
Women government ministers of Nigeria
1960 births
Female finance ministers
Finance ministers of Nigeria